Zdeněk Válek (born 2 April 1958) is a retired Czech footballer who played as a midfielder.

Honours
 1980–81 Czechoslovak First League

External links
 
 

1958 births
Living people
Czech footballers
Czechoslovak footballers
Czechoslovakia international footballers
Association football midfielders
MFK Vítkovice players
FC Baník Ostrava players
Bohemians 1905 players